HMS Wellesley was a 74-gun third rate, named after the Duke of Wellington, and launched in 1815. She captured Karachi for the British, and participated in the First Opium War, which resulted in Britain gaining control of Hong Kong. Thereafter she served primarily as a training ship before gaining the almost surely unwanted distinction of being the last British ship of the line to be sunk by enemy action and the only one to have been sunk by an air-raid.

Construction and class
The East India Company built her of teak, at a cost of £55,147, for the Royal Navy and launched her on 24 February 1815 at Bombay Dockyard.

Active duty
In 1823 Wellesley carried Sir Charles Stuart de Rothesay on a mission to Portugal and Brazil to negotiate a commercial treaty with Pedro I of Brazil. The artist Charles Landseer, brother of the famed artist Edwin Henry Landseer, accompanied the mission.

On 23 November 1824, Wellesley was driven ashore at Portsmouth during a gale. Between 25 November 1824 and 30 January 1825, her tender, Wolf, took several prizes, for which prize money was payable.

Wellesley was the flagship of Rear Admiral Sir Frederick Lewis Maitland in the Mediterranean between 1827 and 1830.

Karachi
On 19 June 1837 Captain Thomas Maitland took command of Wellesley, which became the flagship of Rear-Admiral Frederick Lewis Maitland.

On 2 and 3 February 1839 Wellesley,  and troops captured Kurrachee (modern Karachi). Wellesley sailed into the harbour and proceeded to fire at the mud fort on Manora Island, quickly pulverising it. The purpose of the unprovoked attack was to induce the local rulers to sign a new treaty with the East India Company.

Anglo-Persian Treaty 
In March 1839 relations between Persia and Britain came to a confrontation over a number of British demands, including that the Shah permit the British a permanent base on Kharg Island, which they had occupied. Attacks on the British Residency in Bushire led to the dispatch of Wellesley and Algerine to Bushire. The outcome was the Anglo-Persian Treaty, signed 28 October 1841, which recognised a mutual freedom to trade in the territory of the other and for the British to establish consulates in Tehran and Tabriz.

Admiral Maitland died on 30 November whilst at sea on board Wellesley, off Bombay; Commodore Sir James Bremer replaced him.

First Opium War
Wellesley saw active service in the Far East during the First Opium War. Led by Commodore James Bremer in Wellesley, a British expedition captured Chusan in July 1840 after an exchange of gunfire with shore batteries that caused only minor casualties to the British. When she returned from this service, some 27 cannonballs were found embedded in her sides.

On 7 January 1841 she participated in the Second Battle of Chuenpi and the bombardment of fortifications at Tycocktow; both Chuenpi and Tycocktow guarded the seaward approaches to Canton on the Bocca Tigris (Bogue). This campaign resulted in the British taking possession of Hong Kong Island on 26 February 1841.

That same day Wellesley participated in the Battle of the Bogue, which involved bombardments, landings, capture and destruction of nearly all the Chinese forts and fortifications on both sides of the Bocca Tigris up to Canton. Next day, seamen and Royal Marines of the naval squadron attacked and captured the fort, camp and guns at a Chinese position during the Battle of First Bar. The squadron also destroyed the Chinese Admiral's vessel Cambridge, formerly a 34-gun East Indiaman.

Between 23 and 30 May, she participated in joint operations that led to the capture of Canton, and subsequent payment by the Chinese of a six million dollar reparations payment imposed on them. Rear-Admiral Sir William Parker replaced Commodore Sir James Bremer as commander-in-chief of the squadron in China on 10 August.

On 26 August Wellesley participated in the destruction of batteries and defences surrounding Amoy. At one point Captain Maitland placed the Wellesley within 400 yards of the principal battery. This action included the temporary occupation of that town and island, along with its key defensive positions on the Island of Koo-Lang-Soo, which were garrisoned. Lastly, on 1 October the British, who had withdrawn in February, reoccupied Chusan and the city of Tinghae. The British proceeded to capture Amoy, Ningpo, Woosung and Shanghai, ending with the seizure of Chinkiang and closing the entrance to the Grand Canal on 21 July 1842.

For his services during the war, Captain Maitland was nominated a Companion of the Bath. He was knighted in 1843. Some 609 officers, men and marines of Wellesley qualified for the China Medal. In all, 18 crew and 17 marines died, though not all did so in combat.

Harbour service and training

In 1854 Wellesley was a guard ship at Chatham. That same year she became a harbour flagship and receiving ship at Chatham.

In 1868 the Admiralty loaned her to the London School Ship Society, which refitted her as a Reformatory School. She was renamed Cornwall and was moored off Purfleet in April. Later, Cornwall, renamed Wellesey, was moved to the Tyne and served as The Tyne Industrial Training Ship of Wellesley Nautical School. The actress and theatrical manager Lena Ashwell was born aboard her in 1872. On 10 August 1887, she was run into by the steamship Aviemore and was severely damaged at the stern. In 1928, due to industrial development at that location, she was moved to Denton, below Gravesend.

Loss

On 24 September 1940 a German air-raid severely damaged Wellesley and she subsequently sank. She was raised in 1948 and beached at Tilbury, where she was broken up. Some of her timbers found a home in the rebuilding of the Royal Courts of Justice in London, while her figurehead now resides just inside the main gates of Chatham Dockyard.

Notes

Citations

References

External links
 

 

1815 ships
Black Prince-class ships of the line
First Opium War ships of the United Kingdom
History of Thurrock
Maritime incidents in November 1824
Maritime incidents in August 1887
Maritime incidents in September 1940
Ships of the line of the Royal Navy
Ships sunk by German aircraft
World War II shipwrecks in the North Sea